Actinastrum is a genus of mostly freshwater single-celled Eukaryotes, first described by Gustaf Lagerheim in 1882.

Studies since 2002 have placed Actinastrum as either sister to or a subgrouping within Chlorella, a Charophyte green alga genus in the family Chlorellaceae.

References

External links

Trebouxiophyceae genera
Chlorellaceae